Club León Balonmano, also known as León BM or Cleba León, is a Spanish women's handball team from León, Castile and León, Spain.

History
Club León Balonmano was established in 1996 through a merger of Deleba and Atlético León.

Trophies
Copa ABF: 2
2006, 2011

Season to season

18 seasons in División de Honor

Notable players

  Nuria Benzal
  Raquel Caño
  Fabiana Diniz
  Deonise Fachinello
  Yunisleidy Camejo
  Cristina González Ramos
  Ayling Martínez
  Luciana Mendoza
  Mayara Moura
  María Prieto O'Mullony

References

External links 
 

Spanish handball clubs
Sports teams in Castile and León
Sport in León, Spain
Handball clubs established in 1996